The Toyota GT-One (model code TS020) is a racing car initially developed for grand touring GT1 rules, but later adapted into a Le Mans prototype LMGTP car.  It raced in the 1998 and 1999 24 Hours of Le Mans.

History

Following the end of the Group C era around 1994, Toyota decided to alter its plans in sports car racing by moving to the production-based GT classes for 1995. Toyota decided to approach this in two ways by using two different styles of car for competition. The first was a heavily modified Toyota Supra, referred to as the Supra LM, which would use a turbocharged 3S-GT (503E) inline-4. The second entry was a custom built car designed specifically to be a racing car, yet required a small number of production cars for sale in order to meet homologation regulations. This car was modified heavily from the Toyota MR2, and became known as the SARD MC8-R. The MC8-R would use a custom built Toyota turbocharged V8. While the Supra performed admirably in 1995, the MC8-R would appear superior for 1996. The overall structure of Porsche 911 GT1 has also become the imitation of the MC8R(Front chassis parts is modified from original car, rear using custom racing structure). With development of high powered supercars for the GT classes at the time, Toyota decided that a car similar to the MC8-R, which was intended as a race car first, would be better suited to continuing Toyota's development of a GT car. Thus Toyota announced they would skip the 1997 24 Hours of Le Mans to be able to develop their new GT car for 1998. (A MC8-R was entered for 1997 race, but failed to qualify).

Turning to Toyota's European arm based in Cologne, Germany, Toyota Team Europe (TTE) and Dallara were charged with development of the new GT car. With taking the one-year hiatus, TTE was able to look at what the competition was developing for the GT class, and exploit it to their benefit. In 1997, both the Mercedes-Benz CLK GTR and the Porsche 911 GT1 were dominant cars in their class that exploited loopholes in the rules in place at the time. Each car was a custom built super car of which only a small handful of production cars were built to homologate it. TTE realized that they would actually only need to build a single production car in order to meet homologation regulations, thus allowing TTE to have a car that would never truly be sold to a customer, meaning that any driver luxuries could be left out.

Second, Toyota learned about a loophole which Mercedes-Benz had exploited. All GT based cars were required to have storage space, capable of holding a standard sized suitcase, in order for the car to be considered not only production based, but usable by the public. Mercedes exploited this by putting a small cubby hole into an unused area underneath the rear bodywork, although it was not as easy to access as a normal trunk. Toyota, in their interpretation of the rules, were able to convince Automobile Club de l'Ouest (ACO) officials that the car's fuel tank, normally empty when the car is scrutineered before the race, was allowable as a trunk space since it could, theoretically, hold a suitcase.

With these loopholes in place, TTE was able to set out in laying-out the GT-One.  TTE designed and manufactured the car's carbon fiber chassis and bodywork in-house, while Toyota supplied a heavily upgraded version of the engine they originally used on their Group C cars, the R36V 3.6 L Turbo V8.

TTE also developed the only two GT-One road cars built, required in order for the race car to qualify as a road car-based Grand Tourer. They were painted red and fitted with a basic interior. One was put into a museum in Japan, the other is displayed at Toyota Motorsport GmbH in Cologne, Germany.

Racing results
Introduced in time for Le Mans in 1998, the GT-One first appeared at the official testing days for the race held in May. Three GT-Ones appeared, setting the 2nd, 5th, and 10th best times, easily beating out custom built prototypes which were meant to be the superior class. For the race week itself, all three cars performed admirably in qualifying by continuing their quick pace, qualifying 2nd, 7th, and 8th, being beaten only by their GT class competitor, Mercedes-Benz.

For the race itself, the #28 GT-One suffered from a high speed accident halfway through the race, taking it out of competition. The two other entrants continued to fight on, both remaining in the top 10. However, within the closing hours, the higher ranked #29 GT-One suffered a gearbox failure while in competition for the race win. Thus Toyota was left to take 9th place in the race with the lone #27 entry, which ended the race 25 laps behind the winning Porsche 911 GT1.

Following the success of the GT1 class as a whole over Le Mans prototypes, the ACO and FIA moved to change the regulations for the GT classes, requiring a large amount of production vehicles for the GT classes, thus eliminating the original loopholes in the system. Thus Toyota was forced to make changes to the GT-One, as were all its competitors in the class. Mercedes-Benz opted to evolve their CLK LM into the new custom built CLR in the closed cockpit LM-GTP prototype class, while Nissan and Panoz opted for open cockpit LMPs. Porsche dropped out of competition altogether.  Newcomer Audi decided to build cars for both the GTP and LMP classes, while BMW continued in the LMP class as before. Toyota decided to follow the route of Mercedes and evolve the GT-One into a GTP class prototype.  Although the CLK-LM required extensive modifications to become the CLR, the GT-One was already close enough to a prototype that extensive redesign was not needed.

Toyota began an extensive testing program, including a long distance test at Circuit de Spa-Francorchamps in Belgium soon after a snowfall. In the official testing session at Le Mans, the GT-Ones were again fast, taking the 1st, 3rd, and 5th fastest lap times. This pace continued in qualifying for the race, as the three GT-Ones took 1st, 2nd, and 8th positions.

Throughout the race the GT-Ones battled for the lead with BMW and Mercedes, having it switch multiple times amongst the top competitors. Unfortunately the GT-One was hampered by higher fuel consumption (1 or 2 laps less per stint than BMW) and by failures of its Michelin tires throughout the race, mostly caused by sharp gravel which had been accidentally brought onto the racing surface by other cars. The design of the GT-One's wheel wells allowed for a blown tire to cause extensive damage to the mechanical linkages inside. Thus after only 90 laps the #1 GT-One driven by Martin Brundle was lost when it suffered an explosive tire puncture and was damaged beyond repair, unable to return to the pits and abandoned on the track.  Halfway into the event, the #2 GT-One driven by Thierry Boutsen was lost in a tire puncture that led to a high speed accident, destroying the car. The accident marked the end of Boutsen's racing career. This left the team with only car #3, which was still running at the top of the field.  At this point a large amount of the competition had been eliminated, with all Mercedes out of the race due to their famous accident and withdrawal. Audi had also lost two of their four cars, and Nissan had lost their factory backed R391, although an older Courage C52 campaigned by the team was still active.  BMW and Panoz were the only teams continuing without major problems.

During the final hour of the race, the lone GT-One driven by Ukyo Katayama was chasing the remaining BMW for the lead, but while lapping traffic, it suffered a tire failure, and was forced to slowly make its way around the track to return to the pits for a new set. In the process the GT-One lost the chance to challenge for the lead, and thus lost the race. The lone GT-One would come home 2nd overall, one lap behind the winning BMW. As a consolation prize, the GT-One would win the GTP class, although it was the only car in the class to actually finish.

The GT-One would race only once more, a single entrant appearing in the 1999 Le Mans Fuji 1000km.  Although the race mostly consisted of Japanese teams, thus leaving out most of the manufacturers that had competed at Le Mans, Toyota still had to compete against rival Nissan, who also entered their R391. In the end the GT-One would fall short once again, finishing 2nd and only one lap behind the winning R391. However, Toyota won the LMGTP class (the R391 being an LMP), which would have granted them automatic entry to 2000 24 Hours of Le Mans had they continued the GT-One program.

The GT-One program would not be continued into 2000, Toyota instead turning TTE into leaders of the new Toyota F1 team.  This would mark the end of Toyota's attempts at Le Mans, which had started in 1985, until its return in 2012 with the TS030 Hybrid closed-prototype LMP1 in the FIA World Endurance Championship. With Mercedes-Benz pulling out and Audi eschewing their LMGTP competitor, the Audi R8C, no LMGTP entrants appeared in the next year's race; only Bentley continued to compete in the class until it was abolished as a result of LMP class restructuring in 2006.

Sponsorship
Marlboro was the Toyota GT-One sponsor in 1999 (hence the white chevron with red body livery), although there was an anti-tobacco law in France which meant no Marlboro logos appeared on the car anywhere. In pictures of practice sessions, Marlboro barcodes across the front of the car (which also appeared on the Ferrari Formula One cars during tobacco legislated races) are seen, although these barcodes do not appear on the final race car, even during the Fuji 1000 km race, which was held in Japan, a country with no tobacco sponsorship restrictions at the time. Other sponsors included Zent (#1), Venture Safenet (#2) and Esso (#3 and Fuji 1000 km).

Chassis

A total of seven GT-Ones were built over the two years of the program.  The first six were built in 1998, while the final chassis was built in 1999.

 LM801 - Developmental prototype, never raced.
 LM802 - 1998 24 Hours of Le Mans #29, later a test car.
 LM803 - Road legal version of the GT-One, on display in Europe. Licensed "K-LM-1998".
 LM804 - 1998 24 Hours of Le Mans #28, 1999 24 Hours of Le Mans #3, later on display in Japan.
 LM805 - 1998 24 Hours of Le Mans #27, later a test car.
 LM806 - 1999 24 Hours of Le Mans #2. (Destroyed)
 LM907 - 1999 24 Hours of Le Mans #1.

LM804 was the only car to race in both 24 Hours of Le Mans. LM804 and LM805 were the only cars to finish the 24 Hours of Le Mans, the former as car #3 in 1999 and the latter as car #27 in 1998.

24 Hours of Le Mans results
(Races in bold indicate pole position; races in italics indicate fastest lap)

References

External links 

Official Website of Toyota Motorsport GmbH
Toyota Racing Icons
Toyota GT-One model kit
Toyota GT-One specs and photos
GT-One chassis numbers and history
Toyota GT-One 1999 detail photographs

GT-One
Le Mans Prototypes
Grand tourer racing cars
24 Hours of Le Mans race cars
Rear mid-engine, rear-wheel-drive vehicles